Resistin also known as adipose tissue-specific secretory factor (ADSF) or C/EBP-epsilon-regulated myeloid-specific secreted cysteine-rich protein (XCP1) is a cysteine-rich peptide hormone derived from adipose tissue that in humans is encoded by the RETN gene.

In primates, pigs, and dogs, resistin is secreted by immune and epithelial cells, while, in rodents, it is secreted by adipose tissue. The length of the resistin pre-peptide in human is 108 amino acid residues and in the mouse and rat it is 114 aa; the molecular weight is ~12.5 kDa.  Resistin is an adipose-derived hormone (similar to a cytokine) whose physiologic role has been the subject of much controversy regarding its involvement with obesity and type II diabetes mellitus (T2DM).

Discovery 
Resistin was discovered in 2001 by the group of Dr Mitchell A. Lazar from the University of Pennsylvania School of Medicine.  It was called "resistin" because of the observed insulin resistance in mice injected with resistin.  Resistin was found to be produced and released from adipose tissue to serve endocrine functions likely involved in insulin resistance.  This idea primarily stems from studies demonstrating that serum resistin levels increase with obesity in several model systems (humans, rats, and mice). Since these observations, further research has linked resistin to other physiological systems such as inflammation and energy homeostasis.

This article discusses the current research proposing to link resistin to inflammation and energy homeostasis, including its alleged role in insulin resistance in obese subjects, a subject reviewed by Vidal-Puig and O'Rahilly in 2001, and by M.A. Lazar in 2007.

Inflammation 

Inflammation is the first innate immune response to infection or irritation resulting from leukocyte (neutrophils, mast cells, etc.) accumulation and their secretion of inflammatory, biogenic chemicals such as histamine, prostaglandin, and pro-inflammatory cytokines.  As cited, it has recently been discovered that resistin also participates in the inflammatory response.

In further support of its inflammatory profile, resistin has been shown to increase transcriptional events, leading to an increased expression of several pro-inflammatory cytokines including (but not limited to) interleukin-1 (IL-1), interleukin-6 (IL-6), interleukin-12 (IL-12), and tumor necrosis factor-α (TNF-α) in an NF-κB-mediated (nuclear factor kappa-light-chain-enhancer of activated B cells-mediated) fashion. It has also been demonstrated that resistin upregulates intercellular adhesion molecule-1 (ICAM1) vascular cell-adhesion molecule-1 (VCAM1) and chemokine (C-C motif) ligand 2 (CCL2), all of which are occupied in chemotactic pathways involved in leukocyte recruitment to sites of infection. Resistin itself can be upregulated by interleukins and also by microbial antigens such as lipopolysaccharide, which are recognized by leukocytes.  Taken together,  because resistin is reputed to contribute to insulin resistance, results such as those mentioned suggest that resistin may be a link in the well-known association between inflammation and insulin resistance.

In accordance, it is expected that, if resistin does serve as a link between obesity and T2DM while at the same time contributing to the inflammatory response, then proportional increases in chronic inflammation in association with obesity and insulin resistance should be observed. Recent data has shown that this is possible by demonstrating positive correlations between obesity, insulin resistance, and chronic inflammation, which is believed to be directed in part by resistin signaling. This idea has recently been challenged by a study showing that increased levels of resistin in people with chronic kidney disease are associated with lowered renal function and inflammation, but not with insulin resistance. Notwithstanding, regarding resistin and the inflammatory response, it can be concluded that resistin does bear features of a pro-inflammatory cytokine, and could act as a key node in inflammatory diseases with or without associated insulin resistance.

This adipokine is associated with markers of inflammation in seminal plasma and the concentrations of seminal resistin correlate positively with those of proinflammatory mediators such as interleukin-6 (IL-6),  elastase and tumor necrosis factor-α (TNF-α). During inflammation, the concentrations of cytokines and ROS increase, and this may have a deleterious effect on the male reproductive function. One study showed that there was a negative correlation between the concentrations of seminal resistin and spermatic motility and vitality. (The seminal concentrations of resistin were significantly higher in cases of leukocyte spermia or if the patients were smokers.)

Obesity and insulin resistance

Arguments for 

Much of what is hypothesized about a resistin role in energy metabolism and T2DM can be derived from studies showing strong correlations between resistin and obesity.  The underlying belief among those in support of this theory is that serum resistin levels will increase with increased adiposity. Conversely, serum resistin levels have been found to decline with decreased adiposity following medical treatment. Specifically, central obesity (waistline adipose tissue) seems to be the foremost region of adipose tissue contributing to rising levels of serum resistin. This fact takes on significant implications considering the well understood link between central obesity and insulin resistance, two marked peculiarities of T2DM.

Although it seems that resistin levels increase with obesity, it is questioned whether such serum resistin increases are accountable for the insulin resistance that appears to be associated with increased adiposity.  Many researchers in their respective studies have shown that this is indeed the case by finding positive correlations between resistin levels and insulin resistance. This discovery is further supported by studies that confirm a direct correlation between resistin levels and subjects with T2DM. If resistin does contribute to the pathogenesis of insulin resistance in T2DM, then designing drugs to promote decreased serum resistin in T2DM subjects might deliver immense therapeutic benefits.

Resistin has been shown to cause high levels of 'bad' cholesterol via low-density lipoprotein (LDL), increasing heart disease risk. Resistin increases LDL production in human liver cells and degrades LDL receptors in that organ, impairing the liver's ability to process 'bad' cholesterol. Resistin accelerates LDL accumulation in arteries, increasing heart disease risk, and has an adverse impact on the efficacy of statins, the primary drug used to reduce cholesterol in fighting of cardiovascular disease.

Arguments against 
The amount of evidence supporting the resistin link theory between obesity and T2DM is vast.  Nevertheless, this theory lacks support from the entire scientific community, as the number of studies presenting evidence against it continues to expand. Such studies have found significantly decreased serum concentrations of resistin with increased adiposity, suggesting not only that resistin is downregulated in obese subjects, but also that decreased resistin levels may contribute to the links between obesity and T2DM.  Data contradicting the idea that weight loss coincides with decreased serum resistin concentrations have also been presented; such studies instead report that weight loss is associated with marked increases in serum resistin. The idea that resistin links obesity to T2DM is now under even more scrutiny, as recent investigations have confirmed ubiquitous expression of resistin in many tissues, rather than those only characteristic of obesity, such as adipocytes.

Although nearly as many scientists oppose the theory as those who support it, there is sufficient evidence to support the idea that resistin does have some incompletely defined role in energy homeostasis, while also demonstrating properties that help to incite inflammatory responses to sites of infection.

Structure 

Crystal structures of resistin reveal an unusual composition of several subunits that are held together by non-covalent interactions that make up its structure. The crystal structure shows a multimeric assembly consisting of hexamer-forming disulfide bonds. Each protein subunit comprises a carboxy-terminal disulfide-rich beta sandwich "head" domain and an amino-terminal alpha-helical "tail" segment. The alpha-helical segments associate to form three-stranded coils, and surface-exposed interchain disulfide linkages mediate the formation of tail-to-tail hexamers. The globular domain from resistin contains five disulfide bonds (Cys35-Cys88, Cys47-Cys87, Cys56-Cys73, Cys58-Cys75, and Cys62-Cys77).  This suggests that the disulfide pattern will be conserved.

The interchain disulfide bonds of resistin and resistin-like molecule β (RELMß) are novel in that they are highly solvent when exposed, ranging from 84.6% to 89.5%.  An average solvent exposure for all disulfide bonds is 9.9%, and 16.7% for 1,209 interchain disulfide bonds.  Therefore, the most highly uncovered disulfide bonds found for intact proteins are resistin's disulfides in high-resolution.

A Cys6Ser resistin mutant was substantially more potent at the low concentration and had a greater effect than the wild-type resistin at the high concentration.  This result suggests that processing of the intertrimer disulfide bonds may reflect a mandatory step toward activation. Other results also suggest that both the Cys6Ser-mutant and wild-type resistin target mainly the liver.

References

External links
 

Tissues (biology)
Endocrinology
Obesity